Libor Fašiang (born 21 June 1958) is a Slovak football manager and former player. He is currently coach of FK Senica.

He played for FC Spartak Trnava in the Czechoslovak first division and now he is their coach at the U17 division.

References

1958 births
Living people
Slovak footballers
Slovak football managers
FC Spartak Trnava players
ŠK Slovan Bratislava managers
FC Spartak Trnava managers
Association football defenders
FC ViOn Zlaté Moravce managers